Józef Oprych (18 February 1923 – 3 December 2006) was a Polish footballer. He played in one match for the Poland national football team in 1948.

References

External links
 

1923 births
2006 deaths
Polish footballers
Poland international footballers
Place of birth missing
Association footballers not categorized by position